The Cathedral of San Carlos Borromeo, also known as the Royal Presidio Chapel, is a Roman Catholic cathedral located in Monterey, California, United States. The cathedral is the oldest continuously operating parish and the oldest stone building in California.  It was built in 1791-94 making it  the oldest (and smallest) serving cathedral in the United States, along with St. Louis Cathedral in New Orleans, Louisiana. It is the only existing presidio chapel in California and the only existing building in the original Monterey Presidio.

Early history 

The church was founded by the  Franciscan Saint Junípero Serra as the chapel of Mission San Carlos Borromeo de Carmelo on June 3, 1770. Father Serra first established the original mission in Monterey at this location on June 3, 1770, near the native village of Tamo. However, Father Serra became engaged in a heated power struggle with Military Governor Pedro Fages, who was headquartered at the  Presidio of Monterey and served as governor of Alta California between 1770 and 1774. Serra decided to move the mission away from the Presidio, and in May, 1771, the Spanish viceroy approved Serra's petition to relocate the mission to its current location near the mouth of the Carmel River and the present-day town of Carmel-by-the-Sea, California.

When the mission was moved, the existing wood and adobe building became the San Jose Chapel for the Presidio of Monterey. Monterey became the capital of the Province of Californias in 1777 and the chapel was renamed the Royal Presidio Chapel. The original 1770-71 church along with other buildings in the presido was destroyed by fire caused by a salute gun in 1789 and was replaced by the present sandstone structure built between 1791 and 1795.  It was completed in 1794 by Indian labor. In 1840, the chapel was rededicated to the patronage of Saint Charles Borromeo.

In 1849, the chapel was selected to be the Pro-Cathedral of the Diocese of Monterey by Bishop Joseph Alemany. After Alemany became Archbishop of San Francisco, his successor Thaddeus Amat y Brusi moved the cathedral to Mission Santa Barbara, to be closer to the population in Los Angeles.

Hoover marriage 

Future President of the United States Herbert Hoover and Lou Henry were married February 10, 1899 by Father Ramon Mestres who was serving at the chapel; Hoover was the first President to be married by a Catholic priest. The wedding took place not at the chapel, but in the Henry home.  Father Mestres had received special dispensation from the bishop to perform the civil ceremony because there was no Protestant minister in town at the time.

Architecture 

The Royal Presidio Chapel is the first stone building in California and reflects the exquisite Spanish Colonial style of the late 18th century. The Moorish architecture influence is also evident in the fine architecture. The ornamental arches and portals carved in sandstone make the church unique and arguably the most beautiful of all the Missions. A garden surrounds the gated Mission, with a path leading all the way round and to both San Carlos School and the Rectory of San Carlos Cathedral. To the right of the Cathedral lies a statue of the Virgin Mary with an arch beneath. At the rear of the building is the Junipero Oak, a California landmark. There is a bell tower to announce Mass and in the niche at the very top of the façade there is a statue of Our Lady of Guadalupe, the oldest non-indigenous sculpture in the state.

Associated landmarks and buildings 

The Vizcaíno-Serra Oak. The preserved remains of the tree which is closely associated with the early history of Monterey once stood in the grounds of the cathedral.
San Carlos School. The school is located on the grounds of the cathedral and was established in 1898 by the Sisters of Saint Joseph of Carondolet. It was later run the Franciscan Sisters of the Immaculate Conception. Since 2001, it has been run as a ministry of San Carlos Cathedral with a lay principal and faculty.

Historic designations 
In 1960, the chapel was listed on the National Register of Historic Places #NPS-66000216 as a National Historic Landmark by the National Park Service. The chapel again became the cathedral of the Diocese of Monterey when the Diocese of Monterey-Fresno was split in 1967 to form the Monterey and Fresno dioceses. The cathedral is the smallest in the contiguous United States, and one of the two oldest buildings serving as a cathedral in the United States (St. Louis Cathedral in New Orleans, Louisiana was also completed in 1794).

 California Historical Landmark #105 — Royal Presidio Chapel
 California Historical Landmark #128 — Landing Place of Sebastian Vizcaíno and Fray Junípero Serra

Restoration

A Historic Structure Report was completed in 1999. It documented the history, current condition and  action meeded to conserve the chapel.

Funding for restoration was provided by The Getty Foundation, The California Missions Foundation, The Walker Foundation, the Community Foundation of Monterey County, and private donations.

In May 2007 a concrete apron that had prevented evaporation of moisture within the exterior walls was removed. To divert water away from the sandstone walls, a French drain was constructed around the entire perimeter of the building. The roof was removed to repair termite  damage and to install the attic portion of the engineering retrofit.

Workers removed the plaster covering the original stone walls. They found that the nave walls, built in 1794, were in much better condition than the transepts and apse which were added in 1858. About 80% of the southern-facing rear walls of the church were replaced with 100 tons of new stone and lime mortar.

Seismic retrofit included tying the interior and exterior walls together. The exterior walls were reinforced by drilling vertical holes in the walls and inserting steel bars.

Restorers also discovered that the interior of the church had been decorated much more richly than previously believed.

See also
List of Catholic cathedrals in the United States
List of cathedrals in the United States

References

Bibliography

Morgado, Martin J. Junipero Serra's Legacy. First ed. Mount Carmel: Pacific Grove, California, 1987.

External links 

Official Cathedral Site
Roman Catholic Diocese of Monterey Official Site
National Park Service Discover Our Shared Heritage Travel Itinerary: Early History of the California Coast
Cathedrals of California
Cathedral Listing: drawings and photographs at the Historic American Buildings Survey

San Carlos Borromeo Cathedral history tour
San Carlos Borromeo Cathedral Museum

1770 establishments in New Spain
18th-century Roman Catholic church buildings in the United States
Buildings and structures in Monterey, California
California Historical Landmarks
Churches in Monterey County, California
Churches on the National Register of Historic Places in California
History of Monterey County, California
National Historic Landmarks in California
National Register of Historic Places in Monterey County, California
Roman Catholic churches completed in 1794
Religious organizations established in 1770
Carlos Borromeo, Cathedral of San
Roman Catholic Diocese of Monterey in California
Spanish Colonial architecture in California
Tourist attractions in Monterey, California
Junípero Serra
Charles Borromeo